The Encounter may refer to:

Film and TV
 The Encounter (2002 film), a film by Ömer Kavur
 The Encounter (2011 film), a Christian film directed by David A.R. White
 "The Encounter" (Twilight Zone), a 1964 Twilight Zone episode
 The Encounter (TV series), a 2016 American television series

Books
 The Encounter «Встреча», 1923 poem by Vladimir Nabokov
 The Encounter (Milan Kundera), a 2009 book of essays by Milan Kundera
 "The Encounter" (short story), a 1969 short story by Jorge Luis Borges
 The Encounter (novel), a 1996 Animorphs book

Music
"The Encounter", an art song by John Ireland
"The Encounter", an art song by Toru Takemitsu

See also  
 Encounter (disambiguation)